The acre-foot is a non-SI unit of volume equal to about  commonly used in the United States in reference to large-scale water resources, such as reservoirs, aqueducts, canals, sewer flow capacity, irrigation water, and river flows.

Definitions

As the name suggests, an acre-foot is defined as the volume of one acre of surface area to a depth of one foot.

There are two definitions of an acre-foot (differing by about 0.0006%), depending on whether the "foot" used is an "international foot" or a "U.S. survey foot".

Application
As a rule of thumb in US water management, one acre-foot is taken to be the planned annual water usage of a suburban family household. In some areas of the desert Southwest, where water conservation is followed and often enforced, a typical family uses only about 0.25 acre-foot of water per year.

The acre-foot per year has been used historically in the US in many water-management agreements, for example the Colorado River Compact, which divides  among seven western US states.

Water reservoir capacities in the US are commonly given in thousands of acre-feet, abbreviated TAF or KAF.

In most other countries except the US, the metric system is in common use and water volumes are normally expressed in liter, cubic meter or cubic kilometer. One acre-foot is approximately equivalent to 1.233 megaliters. Large bodies of water may be measured in cubic kilometers (1,000,000,000 m, or 1000 gigaliter), with 1 million acre-feet approximately equalling 1.233 km.

See also

 Cubic meter per second
 Cubic foot per second
 List of unusual units of measurement
 United States customary units
 Unit of measurement

Explanatory notes

Citations 

Customary units of measurement in the United States
Units of volume